Heritage Christian School can mean:
Heritage Christian School in Los Angeles, California
Heritage Christian School (Anchorage) in Anchorage, Alaska
Heritage Christian School (San Diego) in San Diego, California
Heritage Christian School. in Fort Collins, Colorado
Heritage Christian School (Florida) in Kissimmee, Florida
Heritage Christian School (Indianapolis) in Indianapolis, Indiana
Heritage Christian School (Iowa) in North Liberty, Iowa
Heritage Christian School (Montana) in Bozeman, Montana
Heritage Christian School (Canton, Ohio) in Canton, Ohio
Heritage Christian School (Cleveland, Ohio) in Cleveland, Ohio
Heritage Christian School (Findlay, Ohio) in Findlay, Ohio
Heritage Christian School (Oregon) in Hillsboro, Oregon
Heritage Christian School (Virginia) in Woodbridge, Virginia
Heritage Christian School (Milwaukee) in Milwaukee, Wisconsin
Heritage Christian School (Wyoming) in Gilette, Wyoming
Heritage Christian School (Port Macquarie) in New South Wales, Australia, and its smaller annex in Kempsey
Heritage Christian School (Jordan) in Jordan, Ontario Canada
Heritage Christian School (Kelowna) in British Columbia, Canada